The 2018–19 Coupe de France preliminary rounds, Corsica was the qualifying competition to decide which teams from the leagues of the Corsica region of France took part in the main competition from the seventh round.

Second round 
These matches were played on 1 and 2 September 2018.

Third round 
These matches were played on 16 September 2018.

Fourth round 

These matches were played on 30 September 2018.

Fifth round 
These matches were played on 13 and 14 October 2018.

Sixth round 
These matches were played on 27 October 2018.

References 

2018–19 Coupe de France